Ocean Star is a two-masted schooner which conducts educational programs for Seamester Global Programs in the Caribbean Sea. Ocean Star is certified and inspected by the British Maritime and Coastguard Agency for ocean service. Ocean Star undergoes an annual refit in Antigua at Antigua Slipways Ltd.

History

Ocean Star was launched in 1991 as a school ship for Ocean Navigator Magazine. Over the years, she sailed the waters between Canada and the Caribbean, enabling students to learn navigation and nautical skills. She originally operated in the New England and Canadian waters during summer, and the Caribbean Sea and Gulf of Mexico in winter, making frequent stops in Bermuda during her transits north and south. During her time with Ocean Navigator Magazine, she carried six adult students and was crewed by a licensed captain and mate, a navigation instructor, two deckhands, and a cook.

After an extensive refit in 1999, Ocean Star began training students and young adults on solely Caribbean waters. In 1999, she was bought by Sea|mester to host their college sail and scuba training programs. With Sea|mester, Ocean Star sails from her home port in Road Harbour, Tortola as far south as Grenada, with stops in Saint Vincent and the Grenadines, Saint Kitts, Martinique, Nevis, Saba, Sint Eustatius, Antigua, Dominica, Guadeloupe, Saint Lucia, and Saint Barthelemy.

The programs run on Ocean Star inspired the eventual creation of Argo, a  schooner built in Thailand in 2006, which circumnavigates the globe with students.

Specifications
Principal Equipment
 Main Engine: Caterpillar 3208 (210 hp)
 Generator: Westerbeke 15 kW
 Dive Compressor: Bauer Mariner 8.4 CFM
 Air Conditioning: Marine Airr
 Water Maker: Sea R.O. 800 gallons per day
 Refrigeration: 2 x Seafrost BG 1000
 Anchor handling: Galley Maid HW-40
 Tenders: 2 x Avon SR4.0m (50 hp and 30 hp)
 Communication: Iridium Phone/Data Service, cellular phone, SSB, VHF

Vessel Characteristics
 Designer: Murray G. Peterson Associates
 Builder: Howdy Bailey Marine Metals
 Length Overall: 88 ft.
 Beam: 18.6 ft.
 Draft: 9 ft.
 Displacement: 75 Tons
 Height of Main Mast: 95 ft.
 Sail Area: 4400 Sq. ft.
 Hull Material: Steel

References

External links 
Seamester Programs
The American Sail Training Association
Antigua Slipway Ltd.

Individual sailing vessels
Sail training ships
Schooners
1991 ships
Ships of the British Virgin Islands
Ships built in Norfolk, Virginia